The 2018 Big Sky Conference women's basketball tournament was a tournament that held from March 5–10, 2018 at the Reno Events Center. Northern Colorado won their first Big Sky tournament for the first school history and earned an automatic trip to the 2018 NCAA tournament.

Seeds
Big Sky Tiebreaker procedures are as follows:
Head-to-head
Performance against conference teams in descending order to finish
Higher RPI
Coin Flip

* Overall record at end of regular season.

Schedule

Bracket

See also
 2018 Big Sky Conference men's basketball tournament

References

2017–18 Big Sky Conference women's basketball season
Big Sky Conference women's basketball tournament
2018 in sports in Nevada
Basketball competitions in Reno, Nevada
College basketball tournaments in Nevada
Women's sports in Nevada
College sports tournaments in Nevada